Ishq Mein Jeena Ishq Mein Marna is a 1994 Indian Hindi-language romance film produced and directed by Mahrukh Mirzaa, starring debutant actors Ravi Sagar and Divya Dutta. The film was much hyped at that time and was given Tax exemption in Uttar Pradesh, but was an overall box office failure.

Summary

Sapna, daughter of a wealthy father Mr. Kapoor, goes out with her friends for an outing to Nainital. There she meets a young tour guide Suraj. Meanwhile, Mr. Kapoor sends his friend's son Manish, returning from the US, to Nainital to meet Sapna, so that they can get to know each other before their marriage, but as time goes by Sapna and Suraj fall in love. Frustrated, Manish, one day abducts Sapna and tries to rape her. Suraj saves her, but Manish gets killed in an accident. Suraj is now arrested and is tortured by police in lockup. Manish's father bribes the police to kill Suraj in a fake encounter, but Suraj is saved by his friend Pashah and Sapna. They flee from the spot as the whole of Nainital is under surveillance of the police to trace Suraj and Sapna as they are on run for their life itself.

Cast
Ravi Sagar - Suraj
Divya Dutta - Sapna
Aasif Sheikh- Inspector Bhure Lal Yadav
Kuldeep Malik - Manish
Dalip Tahil - Mr. Kapoor
Shafi Inamdar---uncle
Raju Srivastav - Pashah

Music
" Are Baba Yeh Dil Kyon Machalne Laga" - Kumar Sanu, Sadhana Sargam
"Chali Gayee Jaan Meri" - Shabbir Kumar
"Chehra Tumhara Kitna Hai Pyara" - Kumar Sanu
"Kisi Se Mujhe Pyar Ho" - Kumar Sanu, Sadhana Sargam
"Kisi Se Mujhe Pyar Ho II" - Babul Supriyo
"Milta Na Pyar Jo Tera" - Kumar Sanu
"Ruk Ja Mere Chhaila Tu" - Sadhana Sargam

References

External links
 

1994 films
1990s Hindi-language films
Indian romance films
1990s romance films
Hindi-language romance films